Sir Frederick Aloysius Weld  (9 May 1823 – 20 July 1891), was a New Zealand politician and a governor of various British colonies. He was the sixth premier of New Zealand, and later served as Governor of Western Australia, Governor of Tasmania, and Governor of the Straits Settlements.

Early life
Weld was born near Bridport, Dorset, England, on 9 May 1823. His mother, Christina Maria Clifford, was the daughter of Baron Clifford of Chudleigh. Both of his parents were from old recusant Catholic families.

His father, Humphrey Weld of Chideock, was a member of the Weld family. Humphrey's father Thomas Weld (of Lulworth) donated the land and endowed the Jesuit college at Stonyhurst. Weld's upbringing was strongly grounded in the Catholic faith. His early years were spent with his parents in France. Later, he received a good education, studying at Stonyhurst before attending a predecessor of the University of Fribourg in Switzerland, where he studied philosophy, chemistry, languages and law. He had originally intended to pursue a military career, but was convinced otherwise by his tutor at Fribourg. He instead decided to seek a career in the colonies, and arrived in Wellington, New Zealand, on 22 April 1844.

In New Zealand, he entered a partnership with his cousin, Charles Clifford. The two established a number of sheep stations around the country, and Weld became relatively prosperous. Weld found a life of agricultural management to be too mundane, however, and soon became active in political concerns. One of his more significant campaigns was to ward against any potential discrimination against Catholics in New Zealand. He later became active in lobbying for representative government in New Zealand.

In 1848, Weld declined an offer by the governor, Sir George Grey, of a seat on a proposed nominee council. In 1852 he visited England, where he published a pamphlet, Hints to Intending Sheep Farmers in New Zealand, which ran into three editions.

Member of Parliament
 
 

 
 

When the creation of the New Zealand Parliament was announced, Weld stood for election. He became a member of the 1st Parliament as the representative of Wairau, an electorate in the northeast of the South Island; he was declared elected unopposed. The main political division of the day was between "centralists" (favouring a strong central government) and "provincialists" (favouring strong regional governments). On this spectrum, Weld established himself as a moderate centralist, although he tended to oppose the extremes of either side.

Weld was also a member of the brief "cabinet" formed around James FitzGerald. This represented an attempt by Parliament to assume direct responsibility for administering New Zealand. Acting Governor Robert Wynyard managed to block this move, however, and Weld's role as a "minister" came to an end. Despite the failure of the FitzGerald "cabinet", Weld was pleased that Catholics were able to participate fully in politics. The fact that Charles Clifford, also a Catholic, had become Speaker was also encouraging to him.

Weld resigned from Parliament in June 1855, a short while before the end of its first term, returning to England for a brief time. When he returned, he was elected to the 2nd Parliament in a by-election, again representing Wairau. He briefly returned to England again in late 1858 to marry his second cousin, Filumena Mary Anne Lisle Phillipps, daughter of Ambrose Lisle March Phillipps De Lisle and a great grandchild of the 4th Baron Clifford of Chudleigh like Weld, with whom he would have thirteen children.

Cabinet minister
In 1860, Weld was invited to join Edward Stafford's government, taking over responsibility for Native Affairs from William Richmond. In this role, Weld had to contend with conflicts such as the First Taranaki War. Although Weld disliked the prospect of war, and believed that Governor George Grey had mishandled the situation, he believed strongly in the need to assert the power of the government, describing it as a "painful duty". He unexpectedly lost the 1861 election in Wairau against William Henry Eyes, but due to the staggered election dates successfully stood in the neighbouring  electorate a fortnight later, where he defeated Charles Hunter Brown. Weld lost his ministerial position when the Stafford administration was defeated.

In 1864, the government of Frederick Whitaker resigned due to disputes with the Governor. The point in question was who should bear responsibility for funding British troops stationed in New Zealand. Weld, believing that it was British ineptitude that caused conflict with the Māori in the first place, strongly objected to Grey's demands that Parliament should fund the troops. Weld instead believed that British troops should be removed from New Zealand altogether, and be replaced by local forces.

Premier of New Zealand

As Premier, Weld met with mixed success. In 1865 the capital was moved to Wellington, and his proposals for Māori relations were adopted. These two things generated considerable bitterness, however – Aucklanders were angry about the change of capital, and Māori were angry about the confiscation of over a million acres (4,000 km²) of land in the Waikato area. Weld's other success, the withdrawal of British troops from New Zealand, was also controversial, and generated considerable hostility from the Governor. In addition, the government's financial situation was precarious. A little less than a year after taking office, Weld's government resigned.

Colonial governorships
Weld, suffering from poor health and stress, retired from politics in 1866, and returned to England the following year.  However his health improved, and he began working again. In 1869 he published Notes on New Zealand Affairs, and in March of the same year he began a career as a British colonial governor with an appointment to the post of Governor of Western Australia.

Governor of Western Australia
Weld arrived in Western Australia in September, 1869. He immediately embarked on a series of tours of the state, which saw him travel about 1,200 miles (1,900 km) on horseback in his first six months in office. Impressed by the state's isolation, he urged the establishment of telegraph lines and improvements to transportation. In March, 1870, he sent John Forrest to explore and survey a possible route for a telegraph line between Albany and Adelaide. This was later built, and by 1874, the state had more than 900 miles (1400 km) of operational telegraph line. Weld also oversaw the establishment of a steamship service along the coast, and the beginnings of a rail system.

Weld saw his appointment to the governorship as a mandate to institute similar constitutional changes to that achieved in New Zealand. With the enthusiastic support of his Colonial Secretary Frederick Barlee, he set about promoting representative government. At the first opportunity, Weld introduced a Bill which provided for the election of 12 Members of the Legislative Council, to sit with six official and nominee members. The Bill was eventually passed on 1 June 1870.  Barlee then began agitating for responsible government, and in 1874 the Legislative Council passed a resolution calling for it. Although Weld did not think that Western Australia was ready for responsible government, he accepted the situation and passed on the request to the Colonial Office in London. The Colonial Office were strongly against granting responsible government, and were critical of Weld for allowing the situation to arise. In 1874, Weld went on leave to New Zealand to look after his partnership affairs. He is said to have remarked, upon his departure, "At last she moves", in reference to the improvements he perceived in Western Australia. On this return, he was transferred to the post of Governor of Tasmania, and the issue of responsible government was dropped until 1890.

Other colonial governorships
Weld was Governor of Tasmania from 1875 to 1880. He found the role much less taxing than in Western Australia, as Tasmania already had responsible government and his main duty was to preside at meetings of the Executive Council. From 1880 to 1887, he was Governor of the Straits Settlements, consisting of Malacca, Penang, and Singapore.  Louch (1966) writes of Weld's seven years in Singapore: "It was there with his wealth of experience that he found the fullest scope for his talents as a colonial administrator, and where he is best remembered now." He was created in the Order of St Michael and St George first CMG (1875), then KCMG (1880) and ultimately GCMG (1885).

He was a devout Catholic all his life, and the Pope made him a knight of the Order of Pius IX.

Governor of the Straits Settlements

Malay States Administration
In 1880, Sir Frederick Weld arrived in the Straits Settlements. He began to take personal interest in the development of the Malay States. In the middle of 1881, Weld visited the town of Taiping, in Perak. He found "the revenue increasing and everything going on excellent well..." but "labour for public works and roads and to develop other industries and sources of revenue besides tin-mining," he lamented, "is the great want". he also reported that:

"Water supply for Taiping from the hill (Maxwell Hill), the roads to Krian, which will connect Taiping town centre with Province Wellesley, and a rail and tramway from Taiping to the port (Port Weld, which was named after him) are amongst the next most necessary works to be undertaken. the town of Taiping has been much improved since the fire, which took place rather more than a year ago; new streets have been laid out to considerable width, and a better class of houses has been built"

The construction of the Taiping – Port Weld railway was the beginning of a major transformation altering radically the landscape of the Malay Peninsula. It also brought the first influx of Indians (mainly Tamils) and Ceylonese to Perak. Sir Frederick Weld was in Taiping again in 1883 where he "inspected everything". He spent time going down the Port Weld railway line, then in the course of construction, "on a truck behind the Engine". He also put into effect plans to build a telegraph line along the road linking Taiping with Province Wellesley. It was nearing completion after which a railway along the same route would be constructed.

Later life
Weld finally retired from political life in 1887, although he remained active in other fields of work. In 1891, visiting the Straits Settlements once again, he contracted a serious illness, and returned to England. He died in Chideock on 20 July 1891.

Places named after Weld
 Port Weld in Perak, also known in Malay as Kuala Sepetang.
 Weld Road in Kuala Lumpur was named in 1960. In 1982 it was renamed Jalan Raja Chulan after Raja Chulan, but a 1980s shopping complex on that road retains the name "The Weld".
 Weld Hill in Kuala Lumpur, subsequently renamed Bukit Makahmah.  It is now the site of Menara Maybank.
 Weld Road and Upper Weld Road in Singapore and Weld Quay in George Town, Penang.
 Weld Road in Swan View, a suburb of Perth, Western Australia.
 Weld Springs, Weld Range and Mount Weld in Western Australia, all named by explorer John Forrest.
 The Weld River in southwest Western Australia.
 The Weld Club and Weld Square in Perth.
 Weld Street in Hobart, Tasmania.
 Weld Valley and Weld River in Tasmania.
 Weldborough, a locality in north-east Tasmania.
 Weld Cone near Ward, South Island, New Zealand.
 Weld Street in Martinborough, New Zealand, North Island, New Zealand.

References

Further reading

Prime Ministers’ Office (New Zealand) biography

Prof. Khoo Kay Kim, (2003) Taiping The Vibrant Years, OFA Desyne (Kuala Lumpur), Cataloguing in National Library of Malaysia, 
 Frederick Weld by Jeanine Graham, 1983, Published by Auckland University Press & Oxford University Press.

|-

|-

|-

|-

|-

Members of the New Zealand House of Representatives
New Zealand Roman Catholics
Governors of Tasmania
Governors of Western Australia
People from Bridport
Politicians from Dorset
New Zealand people of English descent
Knights Grand Cross of the Order of St Michael and St George
People educated at Stonyhurst College
1823 births
1891 deaths
Prime Ministers of New Zealand
New Zealand MPs for South Island electorates
Colony of Western Australia people
Colony of Tasmania people
19th-century New Zealand politicians
Colonial Secretaries of New Zealand
Governors of the Straits Settlements
Administrators in British Singapore
Frederick Weld